Tommy Shane Steiner (born October 9, 1973) is an American country music artist. He made his debut in 2001 with the single "What If She's an Angel", which reached a peak of No. 2 on the Billboard Hot Country Singles & Tracks charts. It was the first of three chart singles from his singular album Then Came the Night, which was released in 2002 on RCA Records Nashville.

Biography
Steiner was born in Austin, Texas to parents who were both rodeo entertainers. His main goal, however, was to become a country music artist. He began touring throughout the state of Texas, playing various clubs throughout the state. RCA Nashville signed Steiner in 2001, and his debut single, "What If She's an Angel", was released that year, followed by the album Then Came the Night. The single was added to the playlists of nearly 100 of the stations on Billboard'''s panel in one week. "What If She's an Angel" peaked at No. 2 on the Billboard'' U.S. Hot Country Singles & Tracks charts. Follow-up singles were less successful, however, and Steiner parted ways with RCA Nashville in December 2002. He has not recorded since.

Discography

Studio albums

Singles

Music videos

References

1973 births
American country singers
Living people
Musicians from Austin, Texas
RCA Records Nashville artists
21st-century American singers
Country musicians from Texas
21st-century American male singers